The IFFI Special Jury Award and Special Mention (officially known as the Silver Peacock - Special Jury Award and Special Mention) are the two honors presented annually at the International Film Festival of India for excellency in Film Art in World cinema. It was first presented during the 4th IFFI 1969. The award was later re-instated since 29th IFFI 1998. On the occasion of 100 years of Indian cinema, Centenary Awards were conferred during 2012, 2013, and 2014. The Special Mention being awarded since the 46th IFFI 2015.

Recipients

IFFI Special Jury Award (1969–Present)

Recipients

IFFI Special Mention (2015–Present)

IFFI Centenary Award (2012–2014)

References

Lists of Indian award winners
International Film Festival of India
Indian film festivals
Festivals in Goa
Indian film awards